Clunes railway station may refer to:

Clunes railway station (Scotland)
Clunes railway station, Victoria, Australia